Judgment: The Trial of Julius and Ethel Rosenberg is a 1974 American television film. It screened as part of ABC Theater. It was directed by Stanley Kramer and written by Harry Kleiner.

Cast
Allan Arbus as Julius Rosenberg
Brenda Vaccaro as Ethel Rosenberg
Allen Garfield as David Greenglass
Barbara Colby as Ruth Greenglass

Production
It was the first in what was to be three specials for ABC under the title "Judgment" - all would deal with a famous trial. The other two would concern William Calley and Tomoyuki Yamashita. Rehearsals began January 7, 1974. The cast was announced in December 1973.

References

External links

Judgment at Letterbox DVD
Judgment AT BFI

1974 television films
1974 films
Films directed by Stanley Kramer
Films with screenplays by Harry Kleiner
American drama television films
1970s English-language films
1970s American films